The Barnicles & Stripes is the debut EP by Australian punk rock band Something with Numbers. It was released through Below Par Records in 2002. Its title is notable for being spelled incorrectly ('Barnicles' should be 'Barnacles').

Track listing
 "Denenenenenena"
 "We Can Succeed"
 "What I Believe"
 "Barnicles and Stripes"
 "Wednesday"
 "Perfect Match"

2002 debut EPs
Something with Numbers albums